John A. Mohan (born 1939) is an American bridge player from Santa Monica, California.

Mohan graduated from the University of Chicago.

Bridge accomplishments

Awards

 ACBL Player of the Year (1) 1999
 Herman Trophy (1) 1977

Wins

 North American Bridge Championships (20)
 von Zedtwitz Life Master Pairs (1) 1999 
 Rockwell Mixed Pairs (1) 1972 
 Blue Ribbon Pairs (1) 1999 
 Nail Life Master Open Pairs (2) 1976, 1985 
 Jacoby Open Swiss Teams (3) 1985, 1987, 1999 
 Vanderbilt (5) 1975, 1976, 1988, 1992, 2002 
 Senior Knockout Teams (1) 2003 
 Keohane North American Swiss Teams (1) 2013 
 Mitchell Board-a-Match Teams (1) 1994 
 Spingold (1) 1976

Runners-up

 North American Bridge Championships
 von Zedtwitz Life Master Pairs (3) 1990, 2000, 2004 
 Nail Life Master Open Pairs (1) 1977 
 Vanderbilt (1) 2001 
 Mitchell Board-a-Match Teams (2) 1985, 2000

Notes

Living people
American contract bridge players
1939 births
Place of birth missing (living people)
Date of birth missing (living people)
People from Santa Monica, California
University of Chicago alumni